Manfred Kirchheimer (born 1931) is a documentary film maker and professor of film at the School of Visual Arts in New York City. He previously taught at NYIT. He was born in Saarbrücken, Germany, and his family moved to New York City in 1936 to escape Nazi Germany.  After receiving a B.A. from the City College of New York in 1952, he worked primarily as a film editor and he also began making his own films.  A major theme in many of his documentaries is urban life.  His most notable documentaries include: Stations of the Elevated, We Were So Beloved, Tall: The American Skyscraper and Louis Sullivan, and Art Is... The Permanent Revolution.

Biography
In 1936, Kirchheimer's family fled to the United States from Nazi Germany. After arriving, he attended the New York City Public Schools. Upon graduating high school, he began studying film production with Hans Richter at the Hans Richter Institute of Film Techniques at the City College of New York from 1948 to 1952, receiving a B.A.

For the next 24 years, Kirchheimer worked as an editor, director, and camera operator in the New York film industry.  He edited on over 300 films for ABC, CBS, NBC, and National Educational Television.  The subjects of these films ranged from cultural to biographical.  During these years, he also financed his own independent films while also working with Hans Richter and Jay Leyda on films.  In 1963, he was a camera operator for Leo Hurwitz.

As of 2014, Kirchheimer is a professor of film at the School of Visual Arts.

Filmography

Style
Kirchheimer's films typically focus on aspects of urban life.  His films have been described as "hopeful, yet they admonish for the future". He typically uses written commentary on screen rather than voice-over in his films.  He often creates complex layerings of sound to create novel sound environments rather than the sound at the actual scene. About his audience he has said

He also avoids collaborating with others in making films because

Funding
According to Kirchheimer, most of the films he has made he paid for himself. His first film Colossus on the River cost about $3,500 to make. The first grant he received was $10,000 to make Stations of the Elevated, which he said paid for about half of the film.  He also received grants to make We Were So Beloved, which paid for some but not all of the film making.  Kirchheimer stated that he probably can make documentaries at lower cost than others because his former students help him without pay, but if he ever does make money from a film, they will get some of the proceeds. Kirchheimer stated in 2010 that he has never made back the money he has spent on his films.

Films

Awards and Grants
Kirchheimer has received a number of awards and grants for his documentary films including awards from: Athens International Film Festival, Yale Film Festival, American Film Festival, RiverRun International Film Festival, Ciné Golden Eagle, American Film Institute, National Endowment for the Arts, National Endowment for the Humanities, and New York State Council on the Arts.

References

Further reading

External links
Official Faculty site at the School of Visual Arts

1931 births
Living people
City College of New York alumni
American documentary film directors
Documentary film editors
Film people from Saarland
Film directors from New York City
Jewish emigrants from Nazi Germany to the United States
Jews and Judaism in New York City
People from Saarbrücken
School of Visual Arts faculty
New York Institute of Technology faculty